Hugger Mugger is the 27th book in Robert B. Parker's  Spenser series and first published in 2000.

Spenser investigates who is threatening a horse named Hugger Mugger.

References

2000 American novels
American detective novels
Spenser (novel series)
Horse racing novels